The following lists events that happened during 1870 in New Zealand.

Incumbents

Regal and viceregal
Head of State – Queen Victoria
Governor – Sir George Ferguson Bowen

Government and law
The 4th New Zealand Parliament continues.

Speaker of the House – Sir David Monro stands down at the end of the year. He will be replaced after the 1871 election by Sir Francis Dillon Bell
Premier – William Fox
Minister of Finance – Julius Vogel
Chief Justice – Hon Sir George Arney

Voting in New Zealand elections is changed to a secret ballot.

Main centre leaders
Mayor of Christchurch – John Anderson followed by Andrew Duncan
Mayor of Dunedin – Thomas Birch followed by Henry Fish
Mayor of Wellington – Joseph Dransfield

Events 
 27 August – 3 September: Second visit by Prince Alfred, returning briefly to Wellington before departing for Sydney.
 Torrens system of registered land titles adopted.

Sport

Archery
The first club meets at One Tree Hill, Auckland.

Golf
 New Zealand's first golf course was opened in Dunedin.

Horse racing
There are 2 races for both the New Zealand Cup and New Zealand Derby (presumably at the beginning and end of the calendar year).(Confirmation required)

Major race winners
New Zealand Cup: Knottingley
New Zealand Cup: Knottingley
New Zealand Derby: Malabar
New Zealand Derby: Envy

Rugby union
Charles Monro, son of the Speaker of the House, Sir David Monro, introduces rugby to the Nelson Football club.

14 May – First rugby club match, Nelson College versus Nelson Football Club "The Town" at the Botanical reserve. This was the first interclub game of rugby union played in New Zealand.
12 September – A Nelson team, the "Lunatics", defeats Wellington at Petone.
 – The first "international" between Wellington and a team from HMS Rosario.

Shooting
Ballinger Belt: Lieutenant Goldie (Otago)

Births
 February (no date): Arthur Withy, journalist and politician.
 14 April: James Cowan, writer.
 20 October: C. F. Goldie, painter.

Deaths
 5 July: Henry Powning Stark, politician and sharebroker.
 16 July: Elizabeth Guard, of pioneering whaling family.
 27 November (in England): James Stuart-Wortley, politician
 30 November: Francis Jollie, politician

See also
History of New Zealand
List of years in New Zealand
Military history of New Zealand
Timeline of New Zealand history
Timeline of New Zealand's links with Antarctica
Timeline of the New Zealand environment

References
General
 Romanos, J. (2001) New Zealand Sporting Records and Lists. Auckland: Hodder Moa Beckett. 
Specific

External links